The rusty bolt effect is a form of radio interference due to interactions of the radio waves with dirty connections or corroded parts. It is more properly known as passive intermodulation, and can result from a variety of different causes such as ferromagnetic conduction metals, or nonlinear microwave absorbers and loads. Corroded materials on antennas, waveguides, or even structural elements, can act as one or more diodes. (Crystal sets, early radio receivers, used the semiconductor properties of natural galena to demodulate the radio signal, and copper oxide was used in power rectifiers.) Galvanised fasteners and sheet roofing develop a coating of zinc oxide, a semiconductor commonly used for transient voltage suppression. This gives rise to undesired interference, including the generation of harmonics or intermodulation. Rusty objects that should not be in the signal-path, including antenna structures, can also reradiate radio signals with harmonics and other unwanted signals. As with all out-of-band noise, these spurious emissions can interfere with receivers.

This effect can cause radiated signals out of the desired band, even if the signal into a passive antenna is carefully band-limited.

Mathematics associated with the rusty bolt
The transfer characteristic of an object can be represented as a power series:

Or, taking only the first few terms (which are most relevant),

For an ideal perfect linear object K2, K3, K4, K5, etc. are all zero. A good connection approximates this ideal case with sufficiently small values.

For a 'rusty bolt' (or an intentionally designed frequency mixer stage), K2, K3, K4, K5, etc. are not all zero. These higher-order terms result in generation of harmonics.

The following analysis applies the power series representation to an input sine-wave.

Harmonic generation
If the incoming signal is a sine wave {Ein sin(ωt)}, (and taking only first-order terms), then the output can be written:

Clearly, the harmonic terms will be worse at high input signal amplitudes, as they increase exponentially with the amplitude of Ein.

Mixing product generation

Second order terms
To understand the generation of nonharmonic terms (frequency mixing), a more complete formulation must be used, including higher-order terms. These terms, if significant, give rise to intermodulation distortion.

Third order terms

Hence the second-order, third-order, and higher-order mixing products can be greatly reduced by lowering the intensity of the original signals (f1, f2, f3, f4, …, fn)

References

Radio electronics